The Oklahoma Sooners college football team competes as part of the National Collegiate Athletic Association (NCAA) Division I Football Bowl Subdivision (FBS), representing the University of Oklahoma in the Big 12 Conference. Since the establishment of the team in 1895, OU has appeared in 55 bowl games and has a record of 31 victories, 23 losses, and one tie. Oklahoma is one of only two schools to have appeared in all five of the BCS era bowl games (2001 Orange, 2003 Rose, 2004 Sugar, 2007 Fiesta, 2009 BCS NCG), with the other being Ohio State. Oklahoma's bowl game participation and victories rank among the top of FBS bowl records.

List of bowl games

Key

Bowl games

References

Oklahoma Sooners

Oklahoma Sooners bowl games